Poshtgar-e Shah Babek (also Romanized as Poshtgar-e Shah Bābek; also known as Poshtgar) is a village in Sardasht Rural District, in the Central District of Bashagard County, Hormozgan Province, Iran. At the 2006 census, its population was 124, in 33 families.

References 

Populated places in Bashagard County